Stan (stylized as Stan.) is an Australian over-the-top streaming service. It was launched on 26 January 2015. Stan originally was founded as StreamCo Media, a 50/50 joint venture between Nine Entertainment Co. and Fairfax Media. In August 2014, each company invested A$50 million in StreamCo. StreamCo was renamed Stan Entertainment in December 2014, prior to the January 2015 launch of the streaming service. Nine Entertainment would ultimately acquire Fairfax Media in 2018, making Stan a wholly owned subsidiary of Nine Digital.

The service offers a broad range of film and television content from both local and foreign productions, particularly from the United States and United Kingdom. Stan also includes a growing library of their own original film and television content. With over 2.3 million subscribers, as of August 2020 Stan is the third largest streaming service in Australia, behind Disney+ and Netflix.

Stan's original comedy No Activity became the first SVOD program ever nominated for a Logie Award at the 2016 ceremony.

Content
At launch, the first major programming announcement was the exclusive rights to the premiere season of Better Call Saul as well as the rights to Breaking Bad, which previously aired on Foxtel. It also held the rights to Transparent and Mozart in the Jungle.

The company has a content partnership deal with Sony Pictures, ABC, SBS and its World Movies subsidiary, Paramount Global, MGM, BBC Worldwide, Showtime, CBS, Village Roadshow, and Warner Bros. International Television Distribution. In December 2014, Stan signed non-exclusive agreements with ABC Commercial and Viacom, with the latter covering Comedy Central, MTV, and Nickelodeon programming.

In August 2015, Stan signed a multi-year deal with Warner Bros. International Television Distribution, bringing several new U.S. series to the platform, including Australian premiere series A to Z and Selfie, as well as the third season of The Following (the first two seasons aired on the Nine Network). In 2016, Stan reached an exclusive multi-year deal with CBS Corporation, which included exclusive rights to Showtime original programs (before the launch of Paramount+ in August 2021).

On 13 December 2018, Stan reached a content agreement with Disney to carry films and television series. The agreement ended in late-2019 due to the launch of Disney+. On 20 August 2019, Stan reached an agreement with Paramount Pictures, carrying some of its films, and series such as The Great and Looking for Alaska. In August 2020, Stan reached a multi-year agreement with NBCUniversal for rights to content from Sky Studios and its U.S. streaming service Peacock.

Original content

Stan has commissioned its parent company, the Nine Network, to produce original Australian drama series exclusive to the service and has approached ABC and SBS on the possibility of co-producing shows and films. On 16 February 2015, Stan announced it was developing two original series—a Wolf Creek series and a political drama based on the life of High Court judge Lionel Murphy titled Enemies of the State, with additional productions to be announced in the coming months. On 10 March 2015, it was announced Stan had acquired Plonk, a comedic wine program which had formerly aired on Eleven, premiering season two on 18 June 2015. On 1 May 2015, Stan announced its first commissioned series, a comedy titled No Activity; which premiered on 22 October 2015. Stan renewed No Activity on 15 December 2015 for a second season.

Acquired exclusives
The following is a list of acquired programs which have had their Australian premiere on Stan.

Stan Sport

In November 2020, Stan began to acquire sports rights in association with Nine's Wide World of Sports. These events are carried in a new add-on subscription known as Stan Sport, while the Nine Network holds free-to-air rights to portions of these packages.

In 2021, Stan and Nine began a three-year contract with Rugby Australia to air rugby union on the Nine Network and Stan. Ending a long-standing agreement with Fox Sports and Network 10, Stan holds the pay television rights, streaming all Super Rugby and Super W matches live and ad-free, as well as coverage of inbound tests involving Australia, Argentina, New Zealand, and South Africa, club matches, The Rugby Championship, the Bledisloe Cup, and the Shute Shield, among others. 

Stan and Nine also acquired rights to the French Open and Wimbledon tennis tournaments.

In June 2021, Stan announced the acquisition of the rights to UEFA club competitions, including the UEFA Champions League beginning in August of 2021. In the same announcement it was also revealed that the Australian Open would be broadcast on the platform.

Magazine programs

Commentators 
Rugby Union
 Nick McArdle (Host- Internationals), 2021-present
 Roz Kelly (Host- Internationals), 2021-present
 Sean Maloney (Main Caller- Internationals), 2021-present
 Andrew Swain (Secondary Caller- Internationals), 2021-present
 Michael Chennel (Caller- Super W), 2021
 Martin Lippiatt (Caller- Super W), 2021
 Greg Clark (Caller- Super W), 2021
 Tim Horan (Expert Analysis), 2021-present
 Drew Mitchell (Expert Analysis), 2021-present
 Andrew Mehrtens (Expert Analysis), 2021-present
 Allana Ferguson (Expert Analysis), 2021-present
 Morgan Turinui (Expert Analysis), 2021-present
 Justin Harrison (Expert Analysis), 2021-present
 David Campese (Expert Analysis), 2021-present
 Michael Cheika (Expert Analysis), 2021-present
 Will Genia (Expert Analysis), 2021-present
 Sonny Bill Williams (Expert Analysis), 2021-present
 James Horwill (Expert Analysis), 2021-present
 Heath Tessmann (Expert Analysis), 2021-present
 Sera Naiqama (Expert Analysis), 2021-present
 Dane Haylett-Petty (Expert Analysis), 2021-present
 Gemma Etheridge (Expert Analysis, Sideline), 2021
 Alicia Lucas (Expert Analysis, Sideline), 2021
 Nick Stiles (Expert Analysis), 2021
 Pat McCabe (Expert Analysis), 2021
 Mollie Gray (Sideline), 2021
 Mick Colliss (WA Sideline), 2021-present
 Clint Stanaway (VIC Sideline), 2021-present
 Paddy Sweeney (WA Sideline), 2021-present
 Michael Atkinson (QLD Sideline), 2021-present
 Jeff McTainsh (NZ Sideline), 2021-present

Tennis (French Open, Wimbledon)
 Nick McArdle (Host), 2021-present
 Roz Kelly (Host), 2021-present
 Darren Parkinhost (Host), 2021-present
 Clint Stanaway (Host), 2021-present
 Todd Woodbridge (Host/Commentator), 2021-present
 Brett Philips (Host/Commentator), 2021-present
 Sam Groth (Commentator), 2021-present
 Jelena Dokic (Commentator), 2021-present
 Wally Masur, 2022-present
 Chris Stubbs, 2022-present

Football (Champions League)
 Roz Kelly (Host), 2021-present
 Max Rushden (Host), 2021-present
 Ed Kavalee (Host), 2021-present
 Tom Steinfort (Fill-in host) 2022-present
 Craig Foster (Commentator), 2021-present
 Mark Bosnich (Commentator), 2021-present
 Grace Gill (Commentator), 2021-present
 Mark Pougatch (Sideline Commentator), 2021-present
 Alicia Ferguson (Sideline Commentator), 2021-present
 Jordan Jarrett-Bryan (Sideline Commentator). 2022-present

Stan Event
Stan Event is a add-on pay-per-view proposition for boxing events.

Marketing and subscription numbers
At launch, Australian actress Rebel Wilson promoted the service.

Parent company Fairfax Media claimed they were approaching 100,000 customers by March 2015, however, many of these customers were on a 30-day trial period. In May 2015, Fairfax announced the service was nearing 200,000 subscribers and had a target of 300,000 to 400,000 by the year's end.

In May 2015, Roy Morgan Research found that Netflix had 1.039 million Australian users, compared to 97,000 for former competitor Presto and 91,000 for Stan. In October 2015, Nine Entertainment claimed that Stan had between 150,000 and 200,000 paying subscribers, which they said was ahead of Presto's estimated 100,000 customers.

One year after its launch, CEO Mike Sneesby announced that 1.5 million users had used the service across almost 700,000 subscriptions. In December 2016 Stan claimed to have 600,000 active subscribers. In November 2017 it was reported that the service had over 800,000 active subscribers and revenue topping $100 million a year.

Stan reached 1 million active subscribers in June 2018. By December 2019, the service had over 1.8 million subscribers. 

As of August 2020, Stan passed the 2 million subscriber mark reaching 2.1 million subscribers in total. 
As of May 2021, Stan passed 2.3 million active subscribers and more than 4 million people that had entered their credit card details on the platform. Stan gained nearly 150,000 sport subscribers since it began broadcasting rugby union matches earlier this year.

Subscribers

Supported devices

Hardware supported 
The devices on this list are supported by Stan:
 Apple TV (since 13 May 2015)
 Apple iPad Pro 12.9" and 9.7"
 Apple iPad 2 and all later generations
 Apple iPad Air and all later generations
 Apple iPad Mini and all later generations
 Android tablets and phones running Jelly Bean 4.2 or higher
 Google Chromecast
 Sony PlayStation 3 (since 8 October 2015)
 Sony PlayStation 4 (since 8 October 2015)
 Sony PlayStation 5
 Microsoft Xbox One (since 13 January 2016)
 Microsoft Xbox Series X and Series S
 Telstra TV (Since December 2015)
Stan does not support jailbroken iOS devices.

Software supported 
Supported web browsers by platform:
 macOS: Safari, Google Chrome, WebKit or Firefox
 Windows: Safari, Google Chrome, Internet Explorer, Microsoft Edge, Opera or Firefox
 Linux: Google Chrome or Firefox
 Apple iOS 
 Apple tvOS
 Android

See also

9Now
Internet television in Australia
Subscription television in Australia
List of streaming media services

References

External links 

Subscription video on demand services
Australian streaming companies
Australian companies established in 2015
Internet properties established in 2015
Internet television streaming services
Companies based in Sydney
Nine Entertainment
PlayStation 3 software
PlayStation 4 software
Xbox One software